INS Vijaydurg (K71) was the lead ship of the s of the Indian Navy.

The ship was commissioned on 25 December 1976 and decommissioned on 30 September 2002.

References 

Durg-class corvettes
Corvettes of the Cold War